Acrobasis zamantha is a species of snout moth in the genus Acrobasis. It was described by Roesler in 1987. It is found in Iran.

References

Moths described in 1987
Acrobasis
Moths of Asia